Hallett Peak is a mountain summit in the northern Front Range of the Rocky Mountains of North America.

Mountain
Hallett Peak is on the Continental Divide, flanked by Flattop Mountain to the north and Otis Peak to the south.  Just to its east lie Emerald Lake, Dream Lake, and Nymph Lake, access to which is usually from the Bear Lake Comfort Station. 

The Northcutt-Carter Route of Hallett Peak is recognized in the historic climbing text Fifty Classic Climbs of North America. Non-technical climbers may reach the summit of Hallett Peak by hiking up the Flattop Mountain Trail to its highpoint, then walking south along the ridgeline and ascending the peak over talus piles.

See also

List of Colorado mountain ranges
List of Colorado mountain summits
List of Colorado fourteeners
List of Colorado 4000 meter prominent summits
List of the most prominent summits of Colorado
List of Colorado county high points

References

External links

mountainproject.com
rockclimbing.com

Mountains of Rocky Mountain National Park
Mountains of Grand County, Colorado
Mountains of Larimer County, Colorado
North American 3000 m summits
Great Divide of North America